We'll Sing in the Sunshine is the tenth studio album by Australian-American pop singer Helen Reddy that was released in 1978 by Capitol Records. The album included two songs that were also covered by Johnny Mathis in the first half of that year: "All I Ever Need", which came out on his March release, You Light Up My Life, and "Ready or Not", on which he duetted with Deniece Williams for their June release, That's What Friends Are For. Reddy also ventures into Beatles territory with their rockabilly number "One After 909" and takes on Jeff Lynne's "Poor Little Fool" with accompaniment in the vein of Electric Light Orchestra. This was her first album not to reach Billboard'''s Top LP's & Tapes chart. On February 23, 2010, it was released for the first time on compact disc as one of two albums on one CD, the other album being her 1977 release, Ear Candy. "Blue" was originally featured on the 1977 animated film Raggedy Ann & Andy: A Musical Adventure.



Singles

Just as the lead single ("You're My World") of Reddy's previous album, Ear Candy, was a cover, so was the case here. "We'll Sing in the Sunshine," a hit for Gale Garnett in 1964, was released on March 27, 1978, and became Reddy's first lead single not to appear on the Billboard Hot 100. It did, however, debut on Billboard's Easy Listening chart in the April 22 issue, and peaked at number 12 during its nine weeks there. Of this song, Reddy writes, "For those who can't commit because they hear the call of the open road, this one is for you."

"Ready or Not" had its Easy Listening chart debut as the second single from the album later that year, in the July 1 issue, and got as high as number 28 over the course of eight weeks. The July 15 issue saw the start of the song's five-week run on the Hot 100, during which time it made it to number 73, and in Canada's RPM magazine it reached number 70 pop.

Track listing

Side 1
 "Ready or Not" (Amber DiLena, Jerry Keller) – 3:51
 "All I Ever Need" (Jacques Sawyer) – 3:28
 "Poor Little Fool" (Jeff Lynne) – 4:09
 "One After 909" (John Lennon, Paul McCartney) – 3:02
 "I'd Rather Be Alone" (Bruce Roberts) – 4:16
Side 2
 "Lady of the Night" (Richard Germinaro, Evie Sands, Ben Weisman) – 3:17
 "Catch My Breath" (Alan O'Day) – 2:56
 "We'll Sing in the Sunshine" (Gale Garnett) – 3:34
 "Blue" (Joe Raposo) – 4:32
 "If I Ever Had to Say Goodbye to You" (Steve Gibb) – 3:02

 Rarities from the Capitol Vaults tracks

In 2009 EMI Music Special Markets released Rarities from the Capitol Vaults, a 12-track CD of mostly what were previously unreleased Reddy recordings. Four of the songs were taken from the recording sessions for We'll Sing in the Sunshine'', including an alternate version of "Blue" and:
"Me and My Love" (Bruce Roberts, Carole Bayer Sager) – 3:28
"Together" (Charles Fox, Norman Gimbel) – 3:23
"Rhythm Rhapsody" (Ralph Schuckett, John Siegler) – 4:15

Personnel
Helen Reddy – vocals
Charles Koppelman – executive producer
Linda Grey – public relations
Jeff Wald – management
Francesco Scavullo – photography
Roy Kohara – art direction 
 Personnel on "All I Ever Need", "Catch My Breath", "I'd Rather Be Alone", "If I Ever Had to Say Goodbye to You", "Poor Little Fool", "We'll Sing in the Sunshine"
Kim Fowley – producer 
Taavi Moté – recording and remix engineer 
Sherry Klein – assistant engineer
Linda Corbin – assistant engineer
John Golden – mastering
recorded and mixed at Larrabee Sound Studios 
Billy Thomas – drums 
Willie Ornelas – drums 
Richard Bennett – guitar; steel guitar ("All I Ever Need") 
Doug Rohen – guitar 
Jay Graydon – guitar 
Mitch Holder – guitar 
Thom Rotella – guitar 
Dan Ferguson – guitar 
David Hungate – bass guitar 
Reini Press – bass guitar 
Jim Hughart – bass guitar 
Scott Edwards – bass guitar 
David Carr – keyboards 
Alan Lindgren – keyboards 
Eric Bikales – keyboards 
Vince Charles – percussion 
Gene Estes – percussion 
Kim Fowley – percussion 
 Ben Benay – harmonica ("We'll Sing in the Sunshine")
 Additional personnel on "All I Ever Need", "Catch My Breath", "If I Ever Had to Say Goodbye to You", "Poor Little Fool"
Marc Peters – arranger; conductor; associate producer 
Sid Sharp – concertmaster  
Laura Creamer – background vocals 
Mark Creamer – background vocals 
Denyce Deuschle – background vocals 
Barbara Cross – background vocals 
Nick Uhrig – background vocals 
Marc Piscitelli – background vocals 
 Additional personnel on "I'd Rather Be Alone", "We'll Sing in the Sunshine"
David Carr – arranger and conductor 
Jack Shulman – concertmaster 
Amy Boersma – background vocals ("We'll Sing in the Sunshine")
Marcia Waldorf – background vocals ("We'll Sing in the Sunshine")
Kate Hopkins – background vocals ("We'll Sing in the Sunshine")
B. J. Emmons – background vocals ("We'll Sing in the Sunshine")
Gale Kanter – background vocals ("We'll Sing in the Sunshine")
David Carr – background vocals ("We'll Sing in the Sunshine")
John Joyce – background vocals ("We'll Sing in the Sunshine")
Mark Creamer – background vocals ("We'll Sing in the Sunshine")
Jim McMains – background vocals ("We'll Sing in the Sunshine")
Moose McMains –background vocals ("We'll Sing in the Sunshine")
Personnel on "Blue", "Lady of the Night", "One After 909", "Ready or Not"
Nick DeCaro – producer ; arranger (orchestra and singers); rhythm arranger ("Blue", "One After 909")
David Wolfert – rhythm arranger ("Lady of the Night", "Ready or Not")
recorded at Sound Labs 
Mallory Earl – mixing engineer 
mixing at Hollywood Sound
Steve Mitchell – orchestra recording engineer 
orchestra recorded at A&M Studios
Ed Greene – drums 
Steve Lukather – guitar 
Thom Rotella – guitar 
Reini Press – bass guitar 
Steve Forman – percussion 
Jay Daversa – trumpet 
Bud Shank – saxophone 
Ian Underwood – synthesizers 
Tom Hensley – piano ("Blue", "One After 909")
Jai Winding – piano ("Lady of the Night", "Ready or Not")
Jim Gilstrap – background vocals 
Angela Winbush – background vocals 
Stephanie Spruill – background vocals

Notes

References

 

1978 albums
Capitol Records albums
Helen Reddy albums
Albums recorded at A&M Studios
Albums produced by Kim Fowley